The Leatherneck is a 1929 American silent drama film directed by Howard Higgin. At the 2nd Academy Awards in 1930, Elliott J. Clawson was nominated for an Academy Award in the category Best Writing (Adapted Screenplay). Prints of the film exist in the archives of the Library of Congress and at George Eastman House.

Plot
In the 1920s three U.S. Marines who have deserted return to their base in Tientsin, China; one is dead, one is insane and one is court martialed. On the witness stand he relates their story from the end of World War I. Following the Armistice with Germany Pvt Calhoun temporarily frees a German prisoner of war named Schmidt to go drinking with him. In the bar another Marine, Pvt Hanlon, refuses to drink with a German; their brawl escalates into a fight with the military police where the three become friends. The German eventually migrates to the United States where he enlists in the Marines.

The three Marines reunite in Vladivostok during the Siberian Intervention. The three meet a family of White Russians who have been impoverished by the Russian Revolution and whose only source of wealth is a potash mine the family owns in Manchuria. The three Marines also meet an American mercenary named Captain Heckla who attempts to recruit the Marines in a scheme to trick the Russian father out of his mine and share the wealth. The Marines beat Heckla up, with Tex marrying the White Russian's daughter Tanya.

Heckla gets his revenge by leading a group of revolutionaries who execute several citizens of the town including the father and his son, with Heckla tricking Tanya into coming with him. When Schmidt and Hanlon discover Heckla has taken over the mine they desert to investigate before telling Calhoun. Calhoun also deserts to go after Heckla and rescue Tanya.

When he arrives, he finds Heckla already dead and Buddy having been mortally wounded after a mutual shoot-out. Tex finds Fuzzy in the next room, having been driven insane by continuous torture where water was dripped on him every few seconds. Tanya can't be found and Heckla refused to reveal what happened to her before he dies. The three make their way through the desert together, but Buddy dies in Tex's arms as they travel along the river back to their base.

The military court is prepared to find Tex guilty for desertion and the murder of Buddy without any other evidence. Fuzzy, still insane, sees Tanya searching the streets. It restores his sanity and he calls out to her. Now with a witness, she corroborates the tale told by revealing Heckla took her deep into the desert. She escaped while he was drunk and spent many weeks ill in a village before coming to the city to find her husband. With the evidence presented, they find Tex not guilty of murder, and guilty of desertion with the punishment of being confined for one hour. Tanya tells her husband it was Fuzzy who called out to her and the three embrace as the picture ends.

Cast
 William Boyd as Pvt William "Tex" Calhoun
 Alan Hale as Pvt Otto "Fuzzy" Schmidt
 Robert Armstrong as Pvt Joseph "Buddy" Hanlon
 Fred Kohler as Captain Heckla
 Diane Ellis as Tanya
 Jimmy Aldine as Tanya's brother (as James Aldine)
 Paul Weigel as Petrovitch
 Jules Cowles as Cook
 Wade Boteler as Gunnery Sergeant
 Jack Richardson as Captain Brand
 Joseph W. Girard as the Colonel

References

External links
 

1929 films
1929 drama films
Silent American drama films
American silent feature films
American black-and-white films
Films about the United States Marine Corps
Films directed by Howard Higgin
Pathé Exchange films
1920s American films